Kenneth Turner (born 22 April 1941) is an English former footballer.

He signed for Sligo Rovers in August 1968.

References 

1941 births
Living people
People from the Metropolitan Borough of Barnsley
English footballers
Association football fullbacks
English Football League players
Huddersfield Town A.F.C. players
Shrewsbury Town F.C. players
York City F.C. players
League of Ireland players
Sligo Rovers F.C. players
Sligo Rovers F.C. managers
League of Ireland managers
Footballers from Yorkshire
English football managers